Lambertus is a Latinized version of the Germanic masculine given name Lambert. In the Low Countries and South Africa it has been in used as a birth name. Most people used short forms in daily life, like Bert, Bertus, Lambert, Lamme, and Lammert. People with this name include:

Latinized names
St. Lambertus, canonical name of Bishop Lambert of Maastricht (c.636–c.700)
Lambertus Ardensis (c.1160–aft.1203), French chronicler
Lambertus Ascafnaburgensis (c.1024–c.1088), German chronicler
Lambertus Danaeus (c.1535–c.1590), French jurist and Calvinist theologian
Lambertus de Latiniaco, 13th-century French logician
Lambertus de Monte (1430/5–1499), Dutch scholastic and Thomist
Birth name
Lambertus Aafjes (1914–1993), Dutch poet
Lambertus Jozef Bakker (1912–1969), Dutch writer and publisher
Lambertus Johannes Hermanus Becht (born 1956), Dutch businessman
Lambertus Benenga (1886–1963), Dutch swimmer
Lambertus Bos (1670–1717), Dutch linguist
Lambertus Johannes Folkert Broer (1916–1991), Dutch physicist and mathematician
Lambertus Doedes (1878–1955), Dutch sailor 
Lambertus van Gelder (born 1983), Dutch gymnast specializing in the rings 
Lambertus Johannes Hansen (1803–1859), Dutch painter
Lambertus de Harder (1920–1982), Dutch footballer
Lambertus van Klaveren (1907–1992), Dutch boxer 
Lambertus van Marwijk (born 1952), Dutch football manager and player
Lambertus Neher (1889–1967), Dutch government minister and World War II Resistance member
Lambertus Nienhuis (1873–1960), Dutch ceramist, designer and jewelry designer
Lambertus J.J. van Nistelrooij (born 1953), Dutch CDA politician and MEP
Lambertus Nicodemus Palar (1900–1981), Indonesian diplomat
Lambertus Roelof Schierbeek (1918–1996), Dutch writer
Lambertus Johannes Toxopeus (1894–1951), Dutch lepidopterist on Java
Lambertus de Vos (fl.1563–1574), Flemish painter in Constantinople

People with the middle name Lambertus
Court Lambertus van Beyma (1753–1820), Dutch leader of the Frisian patriots
Antonius Lambertus Maria Hurkmans (born 1944), Dutch bishop
John Lambertus Romer (1680–1754), British military engineer
Alidius Warmoldus Lambertus Tjarda van Starkenborgh Stachouwer (1888–1978), Dutch nobleman and statesman

See also
Lamberg
Lambert (name)
Lampert
Lamprecht (surname)

Dutch masculine given names
Latin masculine given names